The Offaly Junior A Hurling Championship is an annual hurling competition contested by lower-tier Offaly GAA clubs. The Offaly County Board of the Gaelic Athletic Association has organised it since 1907. The national media covers the competition.

History
The junior championship dates back to 1907. It was the second hurling championship to be established in Ofaly, and was originally seen as a second tier championship for teams that were too weak for the senior hurling championships.

Kinnitty defeated Kilcormac–Killoughey in the 2020 championship decider, played in the summer of 2021 due to the impact of the COVID-19 pandemic on Gaelic games.

Format
The series of games are played during the summer and autumn months with the county final currently being played at O'Connor Park in late autumn. The championship includes a group stage which is followed by a knock-out phase for the top teams.

Honours
There is promotion involving the Offaly Intermediate Hurling Championship.

List of finals

Wins listed by club

References

External links
 Junior A Hurling Championship roll of honour

Hurling competitions in County Offaly
Junior hurling county championships
Offaly GAA club championships